The Graduate Student Paper Award is presented by the Science Fiction Research Association to the outstanding scholarly essay read at the annual conference of the SFRA by a graduate student.

Previous winners
Previous winners include:
 1999 - Shelley Rodrigo Blanchard, " 'Resistance is Futile,' We Are Already Assimilated: Cyborging, Cyborg Societies, Cyborgs, and The Matrix."
 2000 - Sonja Fritzsche, "Out of the Western Box: Rethinking Popular Cultural Categories from the Perspective of East German Science Fiction."
 2001 - Eric Drown and Sha LaBare (tie). Drown for "Riding the Cosmic Express in the Age of Mass Production: Independent Inventors as Pulp Heroes in American SF 1926-1939" and LaBare for "Outline for a Mode Manifesto: Science Fiction, Transhumanism, and Technoscience."
 2002 - Wendy Pearson, "Homotopia? Or What's Behind a Prefix?"
 2003 - Sarah Canfield Fuller, "Speculating about Gendered Evolution: Bram Stoker's White Worm and the Horror of Sexual Selection."
 2004 - Melissa Colleen Stevenson, "Single Cyborg Seeking Same: The Post-Human and the Problem of Loneliness."
 2005 - Rebecca Janicker, "New England Narratives:  Space and Place in the Narratives of H.P. Lovecraft."
 2006 - Linda Wight, "Magic, Art, Religion, Science:  Blurring the Boundaries of Science and Science Fiction in Marge Piercy's Cyborgian Narrative."
 2007 - Joseph Brown, "Heinlein and the Cold War:  Epistemology and Politics in The Puppet Masters and Double Star."
 2008 - Dave Higgins, “The Imperial Unconscious: Samuel R. Delany’s The Fall of the Towers"
 2009 - Andrew Ferguson, “Such Delight in Bloody Slaughter: R. A. Lafferty and the Dismemberment of the Body Grotesque”
 2010 - Bradley Fest, "Tales of Archival Crisis: Stephenson’s Reimagining of the Post-Apocalyptic Frontier," and Honorable Mention: Erin McQuiston, "Thank God It’s Friday: Threatened Frontier Masculinity in Robinson Crusoe on Mars"
 2011 - Florian Bast, "Fantastic Voices: Octavia Butler’s First-Person Narrators and ‘The Evening and the Morning and the Night.’"
 2012 - W. Andrew Shephard, "'Beyond the Wide World's End': Themes of Cosmopolitanism in Alfred Bester's The Stars My Destination"
 2013 - Michael Jarvis, "'Wherever you go, there you are': Postmodern Pastiche and Oppositional Rhetoric in The Adventures of Buckaroo Banzai Across the Eighth Dimension"
 2014 - W. Andrew Shephard, “'What is and What Should Never Be': Paracosmic Utopianism in Margaret Cavendish’s The Blazing World"

Students
Academic science fiction awards